Athyma pravara, the unbroken sergeant, is a species of brush-footed butterfly found in tropical and subtropical Asia.

References
 
 .
 Savela, Markku (2007). Lepidoptera and Some Other Life Forms: Athyma. Version of 9 March 2007. Retrieved 8 September 2007.
 

Fauna of Pakistan
Butterflies of Asia
Athyma
Butterflies of Singapore
Butterflies of Indochina
Butterflies described in 1857